is a railway station in the city of Annaka, Gunma, Japan, operated by the East Japan Railway Company (JR East).

Lines

Station layout
The station has two opposed side platforms connected to the station building by a footbridge. The station is attended.

Platforms

History
Annaka Station opened on 15 October 1885. With the privatization of the Japanese National Railways (JNR) on 1 April 1987, the station came under the control of JR East.

Passenger statistics
In fiscal 2019, the station was used by an average of 1821 passengers daily (boarding passengers only).

Surrounding area
 
 Annaka City Hall
 Annaka Post Office
 Toho Zinc Plant

See also
 List of railway stations in Japan

References

External links

 JR East station information 

Shin'etsu Main Line
Railway stations in Gunma Prefecture
Railway stations in Japan opened in 1885
Stations of East Japan Railway Company
Annaka, Gunma